Almudena Suarez is an engineer at the University of Cantabria in Santander, Cantabria, Spain. She was named a Fellow of the Institute of Electrical and Electronics Engineers (IEEE) in 2012 for her work on stability concepts to the computer-aided design of nonlinear microwave circuits.

References

Fellow Members of the IEEE
Living people
Year of birth missing (living people)
Place of birth missing (living people)
Academic staff of the University of Cantabria